The Barking & Dagenham Post is a weekly local newspaper in the area of the London Borough of Barking & Dagenham. It is published by Archant.

The paper was originally called the Dagenham Post, and some older residents of its distribution area still refer to it by this name. It is published on Wednesdays and  the cover price for the paper edition is 85p.

An online digital edition is available free on the website from the day after paper publication.

Journalists who formerly worked on the paper include the News of the Worlds James Desborough and the Daily Mirrors Tom Bryant

Notes and references

External links
 
 E-edition

Newspapers published in London
Publications with year of establishment missing
Weekly newspapers published in the United Kingdom
Media and communications in the London Borough of Barking and Dagenham
London newspapers